Kangaroo Flat railway station is located on the Deniliquin line in Victoria, Australia. It serves the southern Bendigo suburb of Kangaroo Flat, and it opened on 1 February 1874. It was renamed Kangaroo on 9 May 1904, and it was renamed Kangaroo Flat on 17 July 1916.

History

The contract for the construction of Kangaroo Flat was let in 1862. In 1904, it was renamed Kangaroo, resuming its original identity in 1916. By 1926, facilities included a signal frame, a pair of side platforms on the double track line, a goods siding and shed on the eastern side of the line, and a crossover between tracks. In 1938, the stationmaster was withdrawn, with the station being worked by the porter-in-charge, under "caretaker" conditions.

From 1889, the station was a block point, under the Winters Block system, but it could be 'switched out' in times of quieter traffic. That status remained until 1980, when the signal box was only 'switched in' when required. In 1987, the signal box was closed, and all points and signals removed.

After a fire in 1990 that caused extensive damage, the station building was left unused, and only two trains per weekday stopped at the station. In 2002, the exterior of the station building and the former goods shed were restored. The Regional Fast Rail project in 2005 saw the line towards Melbourne singled south of the station.

Following a community-led campaign for better services in Bendigo's southern growth corridor, an upgrade of the station was announced in February 2008, involving the construction of a new booking office, a 50-bay car park and bus interchange, and the refurbishment of the waiting room. In January 2014, the platforms were extended, to accommodate longer trains.

Disused stations Ravenswood and Harcourt are located between Kangaroo Flat and Castlemaine, whilst disused station Golden Square is located between Kangaroo Flat and Bendigo.

Accidents and incidents
On 15 February 2017, V/Line VLocity set VL34 derailed after colliding with a vehicle that had been abandoned on the line near Kangaroo Flat. Two people were taken to hospital.

Platforms and services

Kangaroo Flat has two side platforms. Platform 1 is used by almost all V/Line Bendigo, Echuca and Swan Hill line services travelling in both directions. Platform 2 is used by one Bendigo line service towards Eaglehawk every weekday.

Platform 1:
 services to Bendigo, Epsom, Eaglehawk, Echuca, Swan Hill and Southern Cross

Platform 2:
 one weekday service to Eaglehawk

Transport links

Christian's Bus Company operates one route via Kangaroo Flat station, under contract to Public Transport Victoria:
: Huntly – Kangaroo Flat

References

External links

Victorian Railway Stations gallery
Melway map at street-directory.com.au

Railway stations in Australia opened in 1874
Regional railway stations in Victoria (Australia)
Transport in Bendigo
Bendigo